Louise Steel may refer to:
 Louise Steel (broadcaster)
 Louise Steel (archaeologist)